Malcolm Hunter (born 23 May 1950) is a Canadian former cross-country skier who competed in the 1972 Winter Olympics.

References

1950 births
Living people
Canadian male cross-country skiers
Olympic cross-country skiers of Canada
Cross-country skiers at the 1972 Winter Olympics